703 Naval Air Squadron of the Fleet Air Arm of the Royal Navy was formed as a long-range catapult squadron on 3 March 1942 at RNAS Lee-on-Solent. During the Cold War, it was reformed as an experimental trials unit, and then as a helicopter training squadron. Since 2003, the squadron has formed the Royal Naval wing of the Defence Elementary Flying Training School at RAF Barkston Heath.

History

World War II
On 3 June 1942, 703 Naval Air Squadron was formed at RNAS Lee-on-Solent to operate floatplanes off catapult-equipped  Armed Merchant Cruisers. It was initially equipped with Vought Kingfishers, supplementing these with Fairey Seafox and Fairey Swordfish floatplanes. The squadron also operated three Supermarine Walrus amphibian aircraft from Walvis Bay in southern Africa. On 1 May 1944, the squadron was disbanded.

Air Sea Warfare Development Unit (1945 - 1950)
In April 1945, the squadron was reformed as the naval component of the RAF's Air Sea Warfare Development Unit (ASWDU) at RAF Thorney Island, to conduct experimental trials on a large variety of aircraft including the Grumman Avenger, Fairey Barracuda, Fairey Firefly and de Havilland Sea Mosquito. The squadron moved to RNAS Lee-on-Solent in May 1948, absorbing 778 Naval Air Squadron and adding 778's Service Trials Unit role to its existing duties. In 1948–49, the squadron tested plans to land jet aircraft on to a flexible deck, without the use of an undercarriage;trials were conducted by the squadron using a de Havilland Sea Vampire.

Service Trials Unit (1950 - 1955)

In April 1950, the squadron moved to RAF Ford (now the site of HM Prison Ford), concentrating on the Service Trials Unit role and became known as the STU. It was further strengthened on 12 July 1950, when 739 Naval Air Squadron, a unit specialising in development of photographic reconnaissance was merged with 703 Squadron. At Ford it experimented with British innovations in aircraft carrier operations, including the mirror landing aid and the steam catapult. Independent flights were set up for a number of specialist trials. From February to June 1954, "A" Flight was based at RNAS Arbroath for tests of a new controlled approach sysetm for aircraft carriers, while 703X Flight carried out trials on the Fairey Gannet AS1 from March to December 1954 and 703W Flight tested the Westland Wyvern. In August 1955, 703 NAS and 771 NAS amalgamated to form 700 Naval Air Squadron.

Wasp training squadron (1972 - 1981)
On 22 January 1972, 703 NAS was re-formed at RNAS Portland to conduct training on the Westland Wasp, including from February 1975 advanced training, a role it took over from 706 Naval Air Squadron. On 1 January 1981, after 9 years of training aircrew on the Wasp, the squadron was disbanded.

Elementary Flying Training (2003 - present)

In 1993, the RAF and RN Elementary Flying Training was merged to form a single school at RAF Topcliffe, and from 1995, at RAF Barkston Heath. In 1996, after taking on Army Air Corps training, the unit was renamed the Joint Elementary Flying Training School (JEFTS). In 2003, the RAF withdrew from the organisation, and the unit was renamed the Defence Elementary Flying Training School (DEFTS) operating the Slingsby Firefly until 2006. At this time, the Royal Naval element was organised as 703 Naval Air Squadron, and the Army element became 674 Squadron Army Air Corps. 

703 NAS trains about 60 Royal Navy pilots every year. The Squadron previously used the Grob Tutor up until 2018, before transitioning to the Grob Prefect, a Turboprop trainer provided under the new UKMFTS contract.

Aircraft flown
Largely because of its role as a trials unit in the 1950s, 703 Naval Air Squadron has flown a large number of aircraft types, including:

 Vought Kingfisher
 Grumman Avenger
 Fairey Barracuda
 Fairey Firefly
 de Havilland Sea Mosquito
 de Havilland Sea Vampire
 Fairey Gannet AS1
 Westland Wyvern
 Westland Wasp
 Slingsby T-67 Firefly
 Grob Tutor T1
 Grob Prefect T1

See also
 No. 674 Squadron AAC - the equivalent Army Air Corps squadron, previously based at RAF Barkston Heath.

References

External links
703 NAS Elementary Flying Training Website
703 NAS Observer Training Flight Website

Air squadrons of the Royal Navy in World War II
Education in Lincolnshire
Flying training squadrons
700 series Fleet Air Arm squadrons
Military units and formations established in 1945
South Kesteven District